The 9th Screen Actors Guild Awards, honoring the best achievements in film and television performances for the year 2002, took place on March 9, 2003. The ceremony was held at the Shrine Exposition Center in Los Angeles, California, and was televised live by TNT.

The nominees were announced on January 28, 2003, by Megan Mullally and Michael Clarke Duncan at Los Angeles' Skirball Cultural Center's Magnin Auditorium.

Winners and nominees
Winners are listed first and highlighted in boldface.

Screen Actors Guild Life Achievement Award 
 Clint Eastwood

Film

Television

In Memoriam 
William H. Macy presented a clip tribute to the actors who died in 2002:

 James Coburn
 Milton Berle
 Billie Bird
 Eddie Bracken
 John Agar
 Peg Phillips
 Keene Curtis
 Parley Baer
 Nell Carter
 Ron Soble
 Cliff Gorman
 James Gregory
 Mary Stuart
 Jonathan Harris
 Kim Hunter
 Katy Jurado
 Jack Kruschen
 Bill McCutcheon
 Jeff Corey
 Richard Harris
 Robert Urich
 Raf Vallone
 Irene Worth
 Dennis Patrick
 LaWanda Page
 Lawrence Tierney
 Brad Dexter
 Ray Stricklyn
 Rod Steiger
 Dudley Moore
 Rosemary Clooney
 Beulah Quo
 Richard Crenna
 William Warfield

References

External links
 The 9th Annual Screen Actors Guild Awards

2002
2002 film awards
2002 television awards
Screen
Screen Actors Guild
Screen
March 2003 events in the United States
2002 guild awards